Temuera Derek Morrison  (born 26 December 1960) is a New Zealand actor and singer who first gained recognition for his role as Dr. Hone Ropata on the soap opera Shortland Street. He gained critical acclaim for his starring role as Jake "The Muss" Heke in the 1994 film Once Were Warriors and its 1999 sequel What Becomes of the Broken Hearted?

Outside New Zealand, Morrison is best known for his work in the Star Wars multimedia franchise, playing the roles of Jango Fett as well as his many genetic clones, including the clone troopers and Jango's clone son Boba. He originated the role of Jango in the 2002 film Attack of the Clones. Morrison would go on to provide the voice of Boba Fett in the 2004 re-release of The Empire Strikes Back, and then portray Boba fully in the second season of The Mandalorian (2019–present) and the spin-off show The Book of Boba Fett (2021–present). In 2022, he also had a recurring role in the black ops thriller series Echo 3. Morrison is also known for voicing Chief Tui, the father of the title character in Disney's Moana (2016), and for playing Arthur Curry's father Thomas Curry in the DCEU films Aquaman (2018), and Aquaman and the Lost Kingdom (2023). Additionally he will also portray an undisclosed character in The Flash (2023).

Early life 
Morrison was born on 26 December 1960 in the town of Rotorua, on the North Island of New Zealand. He is the son of Hana Morrison (née Stafford), and musician Laurie Morrison. He is Māori, of Te Arawa (Ngāti Whakaue) and Tainui (Ngāti Maniapoto, Ngāti Rarua) whakapapa, and also has Scottish and Irish ancestry. His sister was performer Taini Morrison and his uncle was musician Sir Howard Morrison. His secondary education took place at Wesley College, Auckland, and Western Heights High School, Rotorua.

Career 
His first role was Rangi in the 1973 film Rangi's Catch. He trained in drama under the New Zealand Special Performing Arts Training Scheme. One of his earliest starring roles was in the 1988 film Never Say Die, opposite Lisa Eilbacher. After this he played Dr. Hone Ropata on the television soap opera Shortland Street from 1992 to 1995; he was immortalised when another character rebuked him with the line "You're not in Guatemala now, Dr. Ropata!"

In 1994, he received attention for his role as the violent and abusive Māori husband Jake "The Muss" Heke in Once Were Warriors, a film adaptation of Alan Duff's novel of the same name. The film became the most successful local title released in New Zealand, and sold to many countries overseas. The role won him international acclaim and he received the award for best male performance in a dramatic role at the 1994 New Zealand Film and Television Awards. He reprised the role in the sequel, What Becomes of the Broken Hearted?, for which he received the Best Actor award from the New Zealand Film Awards. Despite the acclaim he received for his performance, Morrison said in 2010 that he felt typecast by the role, to the point that it was "a millstone round my neck".

He has appeared in supporting roles in Speed 2: Cruise Control (1997) and The Beautiful Country (2004). In 2005, Morrison became the host of the talk show The Tem Show on New Zealand television.

In the 1996 Queen's Birthday Honours, Morrison was appointed a Member of the New Zealand Order of Merit, for services to drama.

He started writing an autobiography in 2009, which he hoped would inspire others to "reach for the stars".

He released his debut album, Tem, through Sony Music Entertainment NZ in late November 2014. The album consists of covers of songs that his father, and uncle Sir Howard Morrison, used to perform at local venues when he was growing up.

Star Wars 
Morrison appeared as the bounty hunter Jango Fett in Star Wars: Episode II – Attack of the Clones (2002). Part of the film's plot involves an army of clones created with Jango's DNA; Morrison also provided the voice acting for the clones. He reappeared as a number of clones in Star Wars: Episode III – Revenge of the Sith, and re-recorded the lines of the character Boba Fett (Jango's clone "son") in the 2004 DVD re-releases of the original Star Wars trilogy, replacing the voice of Jason Wingreen.

He has since portrayed Jango Fett and his clones in a number of Star Wars video games, all produced by LucasArts. He played the clone commando "Boss" in Star Wars: Republic Commando (2005), voiced all the troopers in Star Wars: Battlefront (2004), and voiced both Jango and Boba Fett in its sequel, Battlefront II (2005). Morrison reprised his role as Jango in Star Wars: Bounty Hunter (2002), a game centered around the character, and LEGO Star Wars: The Video Game (2005), along with his clones, but was uncredited in the latter. He also voiced Boba in the 2006 game Star Wars: Empire at War, and DICE's Star Wars Battlefront (2015) and Battlefront II (2017), the latter of which were produced by EA.

Morrison physically portrayed Boba Fett for the first time in the second season of The Mandalorian (2020). In the show, Morrison portrays an aged, weathered version of the character. Morrison's Fett has heavy scars on his face, and wears dark robes before reclaiming and restoring his armor. Morrison says that with the physically worn appearance, he adjusted his voice to be more gravelly, as if Boba's vocal cords were affected by his past traumas. With the role, Morrison was also able to bring a bit of his own Māori culture to Fett's portrayal. In an interview with The New York Times, he said that he "wanted to bring that kind of spirit and energy, which we call wairua, [to the role]" and used that influence in his on-screen fight scenes, both in the hand-to-hand combat and while wielding weapons.

In 2020, a spinoff of the hit series The Mandalorian was announced, titled The Book of Boba Fett. Morrison reprises his role as Boba Fett, following Fett's life after the events of the 1983 film Return of the Jedi. The series premiered on 29 December 2021.

In 2022, Morrison made a cameo appearance as a homeless veteran clone trooper in the Obi-Wan Kenobi TV series.

Other roles 
Morrison returned to Shortland Street for six weeks in June/July 2008 to reprise the role of Dr. Hone Ropata.

In 2008, Morrison also appeared on New Zealand skit comedy television show Pulp Sport, where he appeared in a sketch that made fun of him being cloned.

Morrison has appeared in two separate DC Comics related films. The first, portraying Abin Sur in the 2011 film Green Lantern. In 2018 he played lighthouse keeper and Arthur‘s father Tom Curry in Aquaman. He will reprise the role in The Flash set for release on 	June 16 2023 and, Aquaman and the Lost Kingdom, also scheduled to be released in 2023 that winter in December.

Personal life 

Morrison lives in New Zealand, and divides his time between filming there, Australia, and the United States. He has an adult son from a relationship in the late-1980s with singer Kim Willoughby from the all-girl group When the Cat's Away; and a daughter with Peata Melbourne. Morrison's partner is Ashlee Howden-Sadlier, who is of Māori descent (specifically Tūhoe and Ngāti Porou descent).

Filmography

Film

Television

Video games

References

External links
 
 
 
 Betros, Chris (17 July 2006). "Once a warrior, Temuera Morrison now New Zealand's best known film star". Japan Today. Retrieved 20 February 2007.

1960 births
Living people
20th-century New Zealand male actors
21st-century New Zealand male actors
Members of the New Zealand Order of Merit
New Zealand male child actors
New Zealand male film actors
New Zealand male Māori actors
New Zealand male soap opera actors
New Zealand male television actors
New Zealand male video game actors
New Zealand male voice actors
New Zealand people of Irish descent
New Zealand people of Scottish descent
People educated at Wesley College, Auckland
People educated at Western Heights High School
People from Rotorua
Te Arawa people